Tariq Mehmood Jahangiri (Pashto: طارق محمود جهانګیري, Urdu: طارق محمود جہانگیری) was born on December 12, 1966, in Peshawar, Pakistan. Tariq is a Pakistani Jurist and Judge at the Islamabad High Court. Also, Prior to his appointment at the Islamabad High Court he was an advocate at the Supreme Court of Pakistan (The first from Khyber Pakhtunkhwa). He was also an Advocate General at the Supreme Court. In 2016, he was the President of the Islamabad High Court Bar Association.

Career 
Jahangiri started his law career working at the Islamabad Bar Association as the General Secretary between 2002 and 2003. In 2005, he was elected the President of the Islamabad Bar Association. Tariq was appointed Deputy Prosecutor General of the National Accountability Bureau in 2009 and served in that position till 2010. After serving as Deputy Prosecutor, he was appointed Deputy Attorney General of Pakistan. He served as Deputy Attorney General of Pakistan from 2011 to 2013.

In March 2016, Jahangiri was elected President Islamabad High Court Bar Association. He was president till February 2020.

Tariq in December 2020 was appointed Judge of the Islamabad High Court by President Arif Alvi.

References 

Living people
Pakistani judges
Judges of the Islamabad High Court
Pakistani lawyers
1966 births